The Bakenesserkerk is a former church and seat of the local archeological workgroup in Haarlem, Netherlands, on the Vrouwestraat 10. Its characteristic white tower can be seen in cityscapes of Haarlem. The entrance is opposite the rear entrance to the Teylers Hofje.

History
It was founded in the 13th century by William II of Holland as "Onze Lieve Vrouwenkapel", and the white sandstone tower was added in 1520. After the Siege of Haarlem when 1500 soldiers were held here before being killed by the Spanish after their victory, the church was used to store turf for fifty years. Inscribed above the 1620 doorway on the north side is the Latin text .

The church is currently in use as exhibition space for the workgroup of the Archeologisch Museum Haarlem.

References

External links
 Bakenesserkerk on neighborhood website

Religious buildings and structures completed in 1520
Towers completed in the 16th century
Churches in Haarlem
Rijksmonuments in Haarlem
1520 establishments in the Holy Roman Empire